Butter (known as Never 2 Big in the United States) is a 1998 action film starring Ernie Hudson, Nia Long, Tony Todd and Donnie Wahlberg. It originally premiered on HBO as an HBO Original Film. It was later released to video by Artisan Entertainment as Never 2 Big in 1998 and on DVD in 2001.

The film follows corrupt record company executives who kill a singing sensation with a lethal injection rather than letting her leave their label and join another company. They then frame her foster brother for the murder forcing him to go on the run and to try to get the goods on the real killers.

Cast
Shemar Moore as Freddy Roland
Ernie Hudson as Curtis "8-Ball" Harris
Nia Long as Carmen Jones
Donnie Wahlberg as Rick Darren 
Tony Todd as Benzo Al
Tom "Tiny" Lister as House
Terrence Howard as Dexter Banks
Donald Faison as Khaleed
Salli Richardson as Blusette Ford 
Badja Djola as Roscoe
Sam Phillips as Dina
Ernie Hudson Jr. as Marcus

Soundtrack

The soundtrack to the film was released on March 31, 1998, through Relativity Records and consisted of hip hop and R&B music.

Track listing
"Work"- 3:21 (Naughty by Nature, Mag & Castro)  
"Butta"- 3:48 (E-A-Ski)  
"Smiling Faces Sometimes"- 4:47 (Polyester Playaz) 
"Triple Six Klubhouse"- 2:44 (Lord Infamous)  
"M.O.B."- 4:06 (Hussein Fatal)
"Broken Down"- 4:27 (Vincent Brantley)  
"No Ways Tired"- 4:54 (Nancey Jackson) 
"Pain"- 6:14 (Ohio Players)  
"Big Boy"- 3:31 (Indo G)  
"Sorry But It's Over Now"- 4:23 (Michelle Mitchell) 
"Hit 'Em"- 3:53 (Three 6 Mafia) 
"Off the Books"- 3:03 (The Beatnuts, Cuban Link & Big Punisher) 
"Superhero"- 4:22 (Christopher Williams)

External links

 

1998 films
1998 action thriller films
HBO Films films
American action thriller films
American films about revenge
Artisan Entertainment films
African-American films
1990s English-language films
1990s American films